= Moghavemat Shiraz F.C. =

Moghavemat Shiraz F.C. or Moghavemat Fars F.C. may refer to:

- Moghavemat Sepasi Fars F.C., an Iran Pro League club, formerly known as Fajr Sepasi F.C., based in Shiraz, Fars
- Moghavemat Basij Shiraz F.C., an Azadegan League club, formerly known as Mersad Shiraz F.C., based in Shiraz, Fars
